Jack Kirby (1917–1994) was an American comic book writer. 

Jack Kirby may also refer to:

Jack Kirby (Australian footballer) (1889–1939), Australian rules footballer
Jack Kirby (English footballer) (1910–1960), English football goalkeeper
Jack Kirby (American football) (1923–2007), American football player
Jack T. Kirby (1938–2009), American historian who wrote about the Southern United States

See also
John Kirby (disambiguation)
Jack Kilby, electrical engineer